Primetel PLC is a Cypriot telecommunications company that offers and develops Voice, Data and Video services. The company owns and operates a truly regional network, spanning across Cyprus, Germany, Greece, Russia and the United Kingdom, providing city-to-city connectivity, data communications, fiber optic fixed network infrastructure and IP-based services between key European and Middle East markets.

History

In June 2009, Primetel announced the launch of its submarine fiber cable landing station in Geroskipou and that Reliance Globalcom had terminated its 2.7 terabit HAWK submarine cable system into it. This makes Primetel the first private operator with such facilities, which traditionally have been a monopoly of CYTA.

In May 2011, Primetel launched the first mobile virtual network operator in Cyprus, making it the third cellphone operator on the island. As the first MVNO operator in Cyprus, Primetel has recently launched Mobile telephony services, becoming the first telecommunications company in Cyprus able to offer Quad–Play services (Fixed and mobile telephony, Internet and TV).

In April 2015, Primetel launched the third mobile network operator in Cyprus. Based on the latest data released in December 2018, Primetel holds 10.50% Market Share in Mobile Subscriptions in Cyprus.

References

External links
Primetel Website
My Primetel
Primetel WiFi
Primetel Short url service

Telecommunications companies of Cyprus
Companies based in Limassol